University rankings in China include rankings of universities ordered by different standards and made by various organizations in China.

There are several comprehensive rankings of universities in China, including Wu Shulian Ranking, made by a team led by Wu Shulian and published in the name of Chinese Academy of Management, Netbig Ranking, made by the higher education internet information company Netbig, and CUAA Ranking, by Airuishen (a company) in the name of Chinese Universities Alumni Association, etc.. Shanghai Ruanke compiles both the Best Chinese Universities Ranking (BCUR) and the world university ranking, Academic Ranking of World Universities.

History
In 1987, a ranking of 86 key universities according to Science Citation Index was compiled by Xiao Ming, Chinese Academy of Management Science.

It's said that the first comprehensive (exactly, synthetic) ranking of Chinese universities was made by Cai Yanhou, Higher Education Research Institute, Central South University of Technology, in 1989. Colleges and universities were ranked in four categories, science (generally comprehensive universities), engineering, agricultural and medical.

The Chinese university ranking on research and development in 1991 was published in 1993 by Wu Shulian, Guangdong Academy of Management Science, which was registered in the year 1993 as a private institute and later ceased and was claimed to be the Guangdong branch of Chinese Academy of Management Science. The 1996 ranking was released in 1997, and since then the annual ranking has been released continuously. It's a single list ranking except 1998 ranking, which consists of comprehensive university ranking and technological university ranking, with Nanjing University and Tsinghua University ranking 1st respectively. In 2000, the comprehensive ranking was released under the name Chinese University Assessment. The ranking was later published in the name of Chinese Academy of Management Science.

In 1998, Netbig, or literally Net Universities in abbreviation, a higher education internet information company, released Chinese university ranking.

In 2002, Chinese university ranking by Airuishen (a company) was released. The CUAA Ranking, released in the name of Chinese Universities Alumni Association, is said made by Cai Yanhou team.

In 2003, a team in Shanghai Jiaotong University, later named Shanghai Ranking (Shanghai Ruanke, literally Shanghai Soft Science in abbreviation), released Academic Ranking of World Universities. Shanghai Ranking also compiles the Best Chinese Universities Ranking (BCUR).

Related 
Rankings of universities in China
Chinese university ranking (BCUR)
Chinese university ranking (Wu Shulian)
Chinese university ranking (Netbig)
Chinese university ranking (CUAA) 
Academic Ranking of World Universities
University rankings

References 

University and college rankings
Universities in China
Higher education in China